The Flinders Ranges are the largest mountain ranges in South Australia, which starts about  north of Adelaide.

The Adnyamathanha people are the Aboriginal group who have inhabited the range for tens of thousands of years.

Its most well-known landmark is Wilpena Pound / Ikara, a formation that creates a natural amphitheatre covering  and containing the range's highest peak, St Mary Peak. The ranges include several national parks, the largest being the Ikara-Flinders Ranges National Park, as well as other protected areas.

It is an area of great geological and palaeontological significance, and includes the oldest fossil evidence of animal life was discovered. The Ediacaran Period and Ediacaran biota take their name from the Ediacara Hills within the ranges. In August 2022, a nomination for the Flinders Ranges to be named a World Heritage Site was lodged.

History 

The first humans to inhabit the Flinders Ranges were the Adnyamathanha people (meaning "hill people" or "rock people") whose descendants still reside in the area, and the Ngadjuri (Ndajurri) people, They inhabited the range for tens of thousands of years  before being dispersed by European settlement after colonisation. Cave paintings, rock engravings and other cultural artefacts indicate that the Adnyamathana and Ndajurri lived in the Flinders Ranges for tens of thousands of years. Occupation of the Warratyi rock shelter dates back approximately 49,000 years.

The first European explorers were an exploration party from Matthew Flinders' seagoing visit to upper Spencer Gulf aboard HMS Investigator. They climbed Mount Brown in March 1802. In the winter of 1839 Edward John Eyre, with five men, two drays and ten horses, further explored the region, setting out from Adelaide on 1 May. The party set up a depot near Mount Arden, and then explored the surrounding region and upper Spencer Gulf, before heading east to the Murray River and returning to Adelaide.

There are records of squatters in the Quorn district as early as 1845, and the first pastoral leases were granted in 1851. William Pinkerton is credited as being the first European to find a route through the Flinders Ranges via Pichi Richi Pass. In 1853 he drove 7,000 sheep along the eastern plains of the range to where Quorn would be built 25 years later (Pinkerton Creek runs through the Quorn township).

In 1851 Wilpena, Arkaba and Aroona were established as sheep stations, and within a few years other runs were marked out through the hills and along the adjoining eastern and western slopes.

In 1852 Kanyaka Station was established by Hugh Proby.

During the late 1870s the push to open agricultural land for wheat north of the Goyder's Line had met with unusual success, with good rainfall and crops in the Flinders Ranges. This, along with the copper mining lobby (copper was mined in the Hawker-Flinders Ranges area in the late 1850s and transported overland by bullock dray), induced the government to build a narrow gauge railway line north of Port Augusta through Pichi Richi Pass, Quorn, Hawker and along the west of the ranges to Marree, to service the agricultural and pastoral industries.

However, rainfall returned to a normal pattern for the region, causing many agricultural farms to collapse. Remnants of abandoned homes can still be seen dotted around the arid landscape. Wilpena station, due to its unusual geography, along with areas around Quorn and Carrieton, are now the only places north of Goyder's Line to sustain any crops. Wilpena has now been left to the wild and is only a tourist location. As of 2009, kukri, unpopular with most Australian farmers as it yields 10–15% less grain than other varieties of wheat, is being grown for export to India.

Mining exploration continued in the region, but coal mining at Leigh Creek and barytes at Oraparinna were the only long-term successes. Pastoral industries flourished, and the rail line became of major importance in opening up and servicing sheep and cattle stations along the route to Alice Springs.

Hawker townsite was surveyed at a bend in the railway line where the train line left the main road to Blinman, and named in 1880 after South Australian politician and pastoralist, George Charles Hawker.

Quorn was surveyed by Godfrey Walsh and proclaimed a town on 16 May 1878. Governor Jervois reputedly bestowed the name 'Quorn' because his private secretary at the time had come from the parish of Quorn, Leicestershire in England.

Features and attractions
The Flinders Ranges are the largest mountain range in South Australia.

The southern ranges are notable for the Pichi Richi heritage steam and diesel railway and Mount Remarkable National Park.

The Heysen Trail and Mawson Trail run for several hundred kilometres along the ranges, providing scenic long distance routes for walkers, cyclists and horse-riders.

Protected areas
Several small areas in the ranges have the protected area status. These include the Ikara-Flinders Ranges National Park near Wilpena Pound/Ikara, the Mount Remarkable National Park in the south near Melrose, the Arkaroola Protection Area in the north, The Dutchmans Stern Conservation Park west of Quorn, and the Mount Brown Conservation Park south of Quorn.

Geology 

The Flinders Ranges are composed largely of folded and faulted sediments of the Adelaide Geosyncline. This very thick sequence was deposited in a large basin during the Neoproterozoic on the passive margin of the ancient continent of Rodinia. During the Cambrian (about 540 million years ago) the area underwent the Delamerian orogeny, when this sequence of rocks was folded and faulted into a large mountain range. The area has undergone subsequent erosion resulting in the relatively low ranges today.

Most of the high ground and ridgetops are sequences of quartzites that outcrop along strike. The high walls of Wilpena Pound are formed by the outcropping beds of the eponymous Pound Quartzite in a synclinal structure. Synclines form other high parts of the Flinders, including the plateau of the Gammon Ranges and the Heysen Range. Cuesta forms are also very common.

The Ranges are renowned for the Ediacara Hills, south-west of Leigh Creek, where in 1946 some of the oldest fossil evidence of animal life was discovered. Similar fossils have subsequently been found in the ranges, including at Nilpena, with an application being made for World Heritage listing to help protect the sites. In 2004 a new geological period, the Ediacaran Period, was created to mark the appearance of Ediacaran biota.

Climate 

The region has a semi-arid climate with hot dry summers and cool winters. Although rainfall is erratic, most of the precipitation falls in winter. There are also some monsoonal showers and storms that move in from the north during the summer. Snow has even been recorded in the Wilpena Pound and at Blinman. As of 2013, the last significant snowfall was in 1995.

Flora and fauna 

The flora of the Ranges are largely species adapted to a semi-arid environment, including sugar gum, cypress-pine, mallee and black oak. Moister areas near Wilpena Pound support grevilleas, Guinea flowers, Liliaceae and ferns. Reeds and sedges grow near permanent water sources such as springs and waterholes.

Since the eradication of dingos and the establishment of permanent waterholes for stock, the number of red kangaroos, western grey kangaroos and wallaroos in the Flinders Ranges has increased. The yellow-footed rock-wallaby, which neared extinction after the arrival of Europeans due to hunting and predation by foxes, has now stabilised. Other endemic marsupials include dunnarts and planigales. Insectivorous bats make up a significant proportion of the mammals. There are a large number of bird species including parrots, galahs, emus, the wedge-tailed eagle and small numbers of water birds. Reptiles include goannas, snakes, dragon lizards, skinks and geckos. The streambank froglet is an endemic amphibian.

The Ranges are part of the Tirari–Sturt stony desert ecoregion.

World Heritage bid
A team acting on behalf of the Government of South Australia and the traditional owners, the Adnyamathanha people, which includes internationally renowned American palaeontologist Mary L. Droser, has lodged the nomination for the Flinders Ranges as a World Heritage Site, on the basis of its unique geological and palaeontological values. It is a lengthy process, and the site needs to fulfil very specific criteria as well as showing strong evidence that its values are absolutely unique in the world. 

The involvement of the Adnyamathanha people, particularly their caring for country and sharing knowledge of their cultural heritage, is an important part of the future management of a World Heritage site. One example is the rock engravings that are understood to be the oldest artwork in the world, some dating back 40,000 years. Elder Vince Coulthard has been involved in the application process, and says that the creation stories also need to be included.

Seven properties in the Flinders have been identified as possessing the technical and scientific evidence necessary to support the bid:
Ikara-Flinders Ranges National Park
Vulkathunha-Gammon Ranges National Park
Nilpena Ediacara National Park
Angorichina (pastoral lease)
Maynards Well (pastoral lease)
Puttapa (pastoral lease)
Arkaroola Protection Area

See also 

 Beverley Uranium Mine
 Edeowie glass
 Ediacara (disambiguation)
 Mawson Plateau
 Mount Chambers Gorge
 Protected areas of South Australia
 Mount Remarkable
 Panaramitee Style

References

Further reading

External links 

  (SA Government)

 
Far North (South Australia)
Mid North (South Australia)